Robert Russell Pursell (18 March 1889 – 24 May 1974) was a Scottish footballer who played for Liverpool in the early 20th century. He was the elder brother of Peter Pursell and uncle of the similarly named Robert Wilson Pursell. He played in the 1914 FA Cup Final, but was banned for life for his part in the 1915 British football betting scandal. However his ban was lifted for his actions in World War I, and he went on to play for Port Vale, before retiring with a broken leg in 1922.

Career

Queen's Park
Born in Campbeltown, Argyll and Bute, Scotland, Pursell attended Aberdeen University before signing for Queen's Park. He scored on his Scottish League Division One debut for the "Spiders" on 28 August 1909, in a 2–2 draw with Heart of Midlothian at Hampden Park. He went on to make 33 appearances in the 1909–10 season, scoring two goals. He scored two goals in 25 games throughout the 1910–11 campaign, which saw Queen's Park finish bottom of the division.

Liverpool
Pucell was signed by Liverpool manager Tom Watson in April 1911 – although Queen's Park were amateurs, Liverpool were subsequently fined £250 for not asking the club's permission before approaching Pursell. A "cool and brainy full-back", he made his First Division debut a 2–1 victory over Sunderland at Roker Park on 30 September 1911. He made 26 appearances in 1911–12, a disappointing season for the "Reds" which saw the club avoiding relegation from the top-flight by finishing a single point over Preston North End, who went down with Bury. The following couple of seasons were to prove to be a testing time for Pursell as he failed to hold down a regular spot in the starting 11, he did, however, manage to play in all of Liverpool's eight cup ties, including the final, in their run to the 1914 FA Cup Final. The game was to be played in front on a reigning monarch for the first time as King George V was to attend the last cup final to be played at the Crystal Palace Park on 25 April 1914. The first appearance in the final for both Liverpool and opponents Burnley, the "Clarets" won the match 1–0 thanks to a Bert Freeman goal.

On 2 April 1915, Liverpool lost 2–0 to Manchester United, Pursell giving away a penalty, and the game was judged to be fixed. After an investigation by the Football League, Pursell and three teammates – Tom Miller, Jackie Sheldon and Tom Fairfoul, were banned from football for life. The incident later became known as the '1915 British football betting scandal', in what was the first major betting scandal to hit the sport. For his service in World War I, Pursell's ban was lifted, allowing him to continue his career. Pursell never broke into the Liverpool starting line-up, and was only selected twice during the 1919–20 season, both times at Anfield and both times against Liverpool's bitterest rivals, Man United on Boxing Day 1919 and Everton the following day. Pursell left Liverpool in May 1920, having made 112 appearances in all competitions for the "Reds".

Port Vale
He signed with Port Vale, thereby joining his brother Peter Pursell for the first time. The two played alongside each other, and were so moved by a public plea by chairman Frank Huntbach for supporters to buy shares in the club that they each bought £5 worth of shares. He made 38 Second Division appearances in 1920–21. The brothers hit their stride by 1922, allowing goalkeeper Teddy Peers to be little more than a spectator as the club went on a run of seven games without conceding a goal. However 29 appearances into the 1921–22 campaign, he broke his leg in April 1922, causing his retirement the following month.

Career statistics
Source:

Honours
Liverpool
FA Cup runner-up: 1914

References

1889 births
1974 deaths
People from Campbeltown
Sportspeople from Argyll and Bute
Scottish footballers
Association football fullbacks
Alumni of the University of Aberdeen
Queen's Park F.C. players
Liverpool F.C. players
British military personnel of World War I
Port Vale F.C. players
Scottish Football League players
English Football League players
Sportspeople involved in betting scandals
FA Cup Final players